Let It Rock is a Juno Award-nominated album that documents American-Canadian singer Ronnie Hawkins' 60th birthday celebration and concert at Massey Hall in Toronto, Ontario, Canada. The concert took place on January 8, 1995 and featured performances by Hawkins, Carl Perkins, Jerry Lee Lewis, the Band and Larry Gowan. Jeff Healey sat in on guitar for most, if not all, of the performances. Hawkins' band, the Hawks, or permutations of it, backed most, if not all, of the acts. All of the musicians performing that night were collectively dubbed "the Rock ‘N’ Roll Orchestra". The concert is among the last recorded of both Perkins and Rick Danko of the Band. An eponymous video of the concert was also released.

The album also included a studio track of Hawkins performing his song "Days Gone By", backed by the Band and the Hawks. It was released as a single which went gold in Canada and reached 51 on the country charts in that country.

Track listing

Personnel
Brent Bailey – keyboards
Jerry Baird – drums
Richard Bell – keyboards
Tim Bovaconti – vocals
Sam Boutzouvis – guitar, vocals
Randy Ciarlante – drums, vocals
Rick Danko – bass, vocals
Terry Danko – bass
Jerry Elston – guitar
Larry Gowan – keyboards, vocals
Leah Hawkins – vocals
Robin Hawkins – guitar
Ronnie Hawkins – vocals, producer
Jeff Healey – guitar
Levon Helm – drums, vocals
Bert Hermiston – tenor saxophone
Garth Hudson – horn, keyboards
Peter Jeffrey – trumpet
Jerry Lee Lewis – piano
Lianne – vocals
Rick Morrison – baritone saxophone
Carl Perkins – guitar, vocals
Stan Perkins – drums
Pat Rush – slide guitar
Joe Schenck – piano
Bob Shindle – engineer
Brian 'Buzz' Thompson – guitar
Steve Thomson – producer
Jim Weider – guitar
Henry Zmijak – monitor engineer

References

External links
Ronniehawkins.com
Allmusic.com
Theband.hiof.no

1995 live albums
Ronnie Hawkins albums
Albums recorded at Massey Hall
Music of Toronto
Quality Records live albums
The Band